Magazine féminin is a French television show that aired  for female audiences on RTF from 21 April 1952 to 2 February 1970. It was presented by Marie Claires editor, Maïté Célérier de Sannois.

Premise

The show dealt with traditional homemaking pursuits such as sewing and cooking for housewives, supported with illustrated images. Magazine féminin was one of few television shows  exclusively aimed at women in France in the 1960s (the other being Dim Dam Dom, which aimed you a younger demographic as opposed to housewives).

References

1952 French television series debuts
1970 French television series endings
1950s French television series
1960s French television series
1970s French television series
1950s cooking television series
1960s cooking television series
1970s cooking television series
Women in television
French-language television shows